The Sternenbote is a monthly scientific journal on astronomy published by the Astronomisches Büro (Vienna). It was established in 1958, and contents include ephemerides of comets and other Solar System objects and observation reports. It is abstracted and indexed in the Astrophysics Data System.

External links 
  

Planetary science journals
German-language journals
Publications established in 1958